Youniverse is the third studio album by Italian metal band Sawthis. The album was released on 30 September 2013 through Bakerteam Records. The record is a concept album about multiple personality disorder, with "The Crowded Room" being inspired by Billy Milligan. Music videos have been released for the songs "The Crowded Room" and "The Waking Up".

Track listing

Personnel
 Alessandro Falà – vocals
 Marco Di Carlo – lead guitar
 Janos Murri – rhythm guitar
 Gaetano Ettorre – bass
 Michele Melchiorre – drums

References

2013 albums
Sawthis albums
Concept albums